Bancroft Middle School may refer to:

A middle school in the San Leandro Unified School District, San Leandro, California
A middle school in the Los Angeles Unified School District in Los Angeles, California
A middle school in the Long Beach Unified School District, Long Beach, California
The Middle School level at Bancroft School, Worcester, Massachusetts